Suffield Academy is a private preparatory school located in Suffield, Connecticut. It was founded in 1833 to train young men for ministry in the Baptist Church. The tuition fees for students are currently $65,000 for boarders and $38,700 for day students. The head of school is Charlie Cahn, who has been in post since 2004. The school is coeducational with slightly more than half the students (55%) being boys. Approximately 15% of the student body are students of color, 18% are international students  and 67% are boarders.

Fourteen dormitories on campus house the boarding students with 90 faculty members serving as dormitory and student advisors as well as teachers and coaches.

History
The early mission of the school was to educate young men for the ministry.  Despite its founding links to the Baptist Church, the institute quickly moved towards a non-denominational model and in 1833 was renamed Connecticut Literary Institute, locally known as CLI. The institute was the only high school in town and local government funding helped to pay for each student's tuition.

Athletics

Suffield competes regularly in a number of interscholastic sports, with a total of 51 teams in 21 sports. There are Varsity, JV, Thirds and Fourths levels throughout several sports. Teams compete against schools including Deerfield Academy, Hotchkiss School, Choate Rosemary Hall, Berkshire School, Kent School, Loomis Chaffee, and Westminster.

Fall Sports
Cross country
Football
Soccer
Field Hockey
Volleyball
Men's Water polo

Winter Sports
Basketball
Alpine skiing
Squash
Swimming and diving
Wrestling
Riflery

Spring Sports
Women's Water polo
Crew
Lacrosse
Baseball
Softball
Tennis
Golf
Track and field

Achievements

 The water polo team appears at the New England Prep Tournament each year, winning in 2009.
 The wrestling team has produced 4 Prep National Champions, 17 New England Champions and many other recognized athletes, as well as winning the Western New England Prep Championships in their 2010–2011 season.
 The riflery team was Connecticut League State Champions for three years running.
 The football team won the New England Super Bowl five years running, with students continuing to play at college level and professional level.
 The baseball team earned four championships in five years.
 The boys' track and field team won two championships and a runner-up spot.
 The girls' soccer team continues to have remarkable success and is stronger every year.

Visual and performing arts
Programs in the visual arts include studio art, photography, multimedia, architecture and ceramics. Theater and music programs include acting, dance, chamber ensemble, women's choir, jazz ensemble, wind ensemble and private lessons in instruments including vocal training.

The visual art department mounts displays throughout the campus with artwork, photography and sculptures. The department also collaborates with the English department to produce an Art & Literary Magazine filled with work by current students.

Suffield's Performing Arts Center also presents many performances for the community throughout the year, such as a Fall Arts Festival, winter musical, spring play, guitar show, dance show, and vocal and instrumental concerts. Recent performances have included "Young Frankenstein", Spring Awakening, The Diary of Anne Frank, Sister Act, Noises Off, In The Heights, The Crucible, Hairspray", August: Osage County, and Into The Woods. Suffield won Best Play at the Connecticut Halo Awards for four of the past six years. In 2017, Sister Act was awarded the Best Contemporary Musical prize at the Connecticut Halo Awards. In 2018, Suffield's production of The Curious Incident of the Dog in the Night-Time was awarded Best Contemporary Play and won an acting award for Dominic Colangelo. 

2018 also marked Suffield's first year in the Stephen Sondheim Awards, where Suffield earned two awards for their work on Hairspray'', including Best Lighting Design and a special recognition award for student choreographer Mia White. Since 2018, Suffield Academy has picked up numerous Sondheim Awards for Best Supporting Actor and Best Choreographer.

Notable alumni

 George B. Daniels 1971 - United States federal judge for the United States District Court for the Southern District of New York
 Vinny Del Negro 1984 - NBA player for the San Antonio Spurs, former NBA head coach NBA's Los Angeles Clippers
 Tarō Kōno - Japanese Foreign Minister
 :Kevin McKeown (politician) 1965 - Former Mayor of Santa Monica, California
 Andrew H. Tisch 1967
 James S. Tisch 1971
 Christian Wilkins 2013 - NFL player for the Miami Dolphins, 13th Overall Pick in the 2019 NFL Draft
 Daniel Webster Gill, Mayor of Cheyenne and member of the Wyoming Senate
 Brian Belichick, Safeties coach for the New England Patriots

References

External links
 

Suffield, Connecticut
Boarding schools in Connecticut
Schools in Hartford County, Connecticut
Private high schools in Connecticut
Educational institutions established in 1833
Preparatory schools in Connecticut
1833 establishments in Connecticut